Nemadoras cristinae is a species of thorny catfish native to the Amazon basin where it can be found in Brazil, Colombia and Peru. This species grows to a length of 12.4 centimetres Standard Length.

References 

Doradidae
Freshwater fish of Brazil
Freshwater fish of Colombia
Freshwater fish of Peru
Fish of the Amazon basin
Fish described in 2014
Taxa named by Mark Henry Sabaj Pérez